Amir Hossein Nemati (born June 16, 1996 in Tehran) is an Iranian footballer who plays as a defender for Iranian club Padideh in the Persian Gulf Pro League.

Club career

Padideh
He made his debut for Padideh in 16th fixtures of 2020–21 Persian Gulf Pro League against Machine Sazi while he substituted in for Hossein Mehraban.

References

Living people
1996 births
Association football defenders
Iranian footballers
Esteghlal F.C. players
Shahr Khodro F.C. players